Laverrière is a commune in Northern France. It may also refer to:

 Alphonse Laverrière, Swiss architect